Live Phish 11.14.95 is an archival release by the rock band Phish. It was originally released on February 20, 2007 in MP3, FLAC and CD formats. The show is known for its near set long version of Stash that includes 25 or 6 to 4, Esther, and Ya Mar teases in Stash, and for its "Immigrant Song" infused "YEM". The song "I'm Blue I'm Lonesome" was performed acoustically, with Trey Anastasio on acoustic guitar, Mike Gordon on banjo, Page McConnell on upright bass and Jon Fishman on mandolin. It is the only release to date to feature the original arrangement of the ballad "Billy Breathes".

Track listing

Disc 1
 "Chalk Dust Torture" (Anastasio, Marshall) - 7:32
 "Foam" (Anastasio) - 10:34
 "Billy Breathes" (Anastasio) - 5:34
 "The Divided Sky" (Anastasio) - 14:55
 "Esther" (Anastasio) - 9:13
 "Free" (Anastasio, Marshall) - 8:54
 "Julius" (Anastasio, Marshall) - 9:16
 "I'm Blue, I'm Lonesome" (Monroe, Williams) - 3:44
 "Cavern" (Anastasio, Marshall, Herman) - 5:00

Disc 2
 "Maze" (Anastasio, Marshall) - 13:46
 "Gumbo" (Anastasio, Fishman) - 5:18
 "Stash >" (Anastasio, Marshall) - 15:31
 "Manteca > Stash" (Gillespie, Fuller, Pozo, Anastasio, Marshall) - 14:14
 "Dog-Faced Boy > Stash" (Anastasio, Fishman, Marshall, McConnell) - 9:23
 "Strange Design" (Anastasio, Marshall) - 3:06

Disc 3
 "You Enjoy Myself" (Anastasio) - 21:33
 "The Wedge" (Anastasio, Marshall) - 4:11
 "Rocky Top" (Bryant, Bryant) - 2:50
 "Poor Heart" (Gordon) - 4:46*
 "Dog Log" (Anastasio) - 7:20*

* Bonus tracks that were a part of the show's soundcheck and are only available on CD version of the release

Personnel
Trey Anastasio – guitars, lead vocals
Page McConnell – piano, organ, backing vocals, bass on "I'm Blue I'm Lonesome", lead vocals on "Strange Design"
Mike Gordon – bass, backing vocals, banjo on "I'm Blue I'm Lonesome", lead vocals on "Poor Heart"
Jon Fishman – drums, backing vocals, mandolin on "I'm Blue I'm Lonesome"

External links 
 Phish.com - Official Site
 LivePhish.com - 11.14.95
 Phish.net - November 14, 1995

References 

Phish live albums
2007 live albums